is a Japanese actor and voice actor from Tokyo, Japan. He is affiliated with Axlone, and was formerly with Mausu Promotion and 81 Produce.

He is best known for his bass voice, which has usually seen him cast in villainous roles such as the voice of Yaiba in GoGo Sentai Boukenger. He is best known to western audiences for providing the voice of Kazuma Kiryu, the protagonist of the Like a Dragon series. Because of his vocal resemblance to the late Hirotaka Suzuoki, he was chosen to replace Suzuoki as the voice of Starscream in Transformers: Cybertron as Suzuoki's health deteriorated. Kuroda is also the lead singer of the rock band Takaya Kuroda & Goodfellas.

Filmography

Animation

Film

Video games

Drama CDs

Live action

Dubbing roles

References

External links
 
Kazuma Kiryū's voice actor has a band — and it's beyond awesome! by IGDB.com via Medium

1965 births
Living people
Japanese male stage actors
Japanese male video game actors
Japanese male voice actors
Male voice actors from Tokyo
Mausu Promotion voice actors
Tamagawa University alumni
20th-century Japanese male actors
21st-century Japanese male actors
81 Produce voice actors